Agaraea sorex is a moth of the family Erebidae. It was described by Herbert Druce in 1902. It is found in Bolivia.

Subspecies
Agaraea sorex sorex (Bolivia)
Agaraea sorex citrinos (Bryk, 1953)

References

Phaegopterina
Moths of South America
Moths described in 1902